You Mean the World to Me may refer to:

 "You Mean the World to Me" (Toni Braxton song), 1994
 "You Mean the World to Me" (David Houston song), 1967
 You Mean the World to Me (EP), 2019 EP by Freya Ridings
 "You Mean the World to Me" (Freya Ridings song), its title track
 You Mean the World to Me (film), 2017